The 2015 Night of Champions was the ninth annual and final Night of Champions professional wrestling pay-per-view and livestreaming event produced by WWE. It took place on September 20, 2015, at the Toyota Center in Houston, Texas. This was the second Night of Champions event to be held in Houston, after Vengeance: Night of Champions in 2007. As per the theme of the event, every championship promoted on WWE's main roster at the time was defended. The event was replaced by the similarly themed Clash of Champions in 2016.

Eight matches were contested at the event, with one match on the Kickoff pre-show. In the main event, Seth Rollins defeated Sting to retain the WWE World Heavyweight Championship. In the penultimate match, John Cena defeated Rollins to win the WWE United States Championship. In other prominent matches, Kevin Owens defeated Ryback to win the WWE Intercontinental Championship, and Charlotte defeated Nikki Bella to win the WWE Divas Championship. With her win, Charlotte became the final holder of the title before it was retired at WrestleMania 32 in April 2016. The event, which included Sting's sole PPV main event and title match in WWE, which would in turn be his final match in the promotion, generated 77,000 buys (up from the previous year's 48,000).

Production

Background
Night of Champions was an annual pay-per-view (PPV) and WWE Network event produced by WWE since 2007. The 2015 event was the ninth event in the Night of Champions chronology. It was held on September 20, 2015, at the Toyota Center in Houston, Texas. As per the theme of the event, every championship promoted on WWE's main roster at the time was defended. These included the WWE World Heavyweight Championship, the Intercontinental Championship, the United States Championship, the WWE Tag Team Championship, and the WWE Divas Championship.

Storylines
The professional wrestling matches at Night of Champions featured professional wrestlers performing as characters. The card consisted of eight matches, including one on the Kickoff pre-show, that resulted from scripted storylines, where wrestlers portrayed heroes, villains, or less distinguishable characters in scripted events that built tension and culminated in a wrestling match or series of matches. Results were predetermined by WWE's writers. Storylines between the characters played out on WWE's primary television programs, Raw and SmackDown.

At SummerSlam, Seth Rollins defeated John Cena to retain the WWE World Heavyweight Championship and win Cena's United States Championship. On the August 24 episode of Raw, The Authority attempted to present Rollins with a statue for winning, but instead Sting made his return to the WWE for the first time since the night after WrestleMania 31 and attacked Rollins, challenging Rollins for the WWE World Heavyweight Championship by raising it over his head. Triple H then scheduled Rollins to defend the WWE World title against Sting at Night of Champions. On the August 31 edition of Raw, Cena invoked his rematch clause to face Rollins for the United States Championship at Night of Champions.

At SummerSlam, Roman Reigns and Dean Ambrose defeated Bray Wyatt and Luke Harper. On the August 24 episode of Raw, during a rematch between both teams, Braun Strowman made his WWE debut, aligning with Wyatt and Harper and attacking Reigns and Ambrose. On the August 31 episode of Raw, Strowman made his in-ring debut, defeating Ambrose by disqualification. On September 5, a Six-man tag team match pitting Wyatt, Harper and Strowman against Reigns, Ambrose and a partner of their choice was scheduled for Night of Champions.

At SummerSlam, Dolph Ziggler and Rusev fought to a double countout. On the September 7 episode of Raw, a rematch was scheduled for Night of Champions.

At SummerSlam, The New Day defeated The Prime Time Players, The Lucha Dragons, and Los Matadores in a Fatal 4-Way tag team match to win the WWE Tag Team Championship. The next night on Raw, after The New Day defeated The Lucha Dragons, The Dudley Boyz returned to WWE and attacked The New Day. The next week on Raw, The Dudleyz defeated The New Day. The next week on Raw, The New Day were scheduled to defend the titles against The Prime Time Players the next week, and were successful, thus setting up a title match between The New Day and The Dudleyz for Night of Champions.

Kevin Owens interrupted Intercontinental Champion Ryback's interview on the September 7 episode of Raw and attacked the champion on the September 10 episode of SmackDown during a lumberjack match against Seth Rollins. On the September 14 episode of Raw, Ryback was scheduled to defend the title against Owens at Night of Champions.

At SummerSlam, PCB (Paige, Charlotte and Becky Lynch) defeated Team Bella (Nikki Bella, Brie Bella and Alicia Fox) and Team B.A.D. (Naomi, Sasha Banks and Tamina) in a Three team elimination match. On the August 31 edition of Raw, three Beat the Clock challenge matches were held to determine a new number one contender to face Nikki for the WWE Divas Championship at Night of Champions. Lynch defeated Fox in 3:21, Charlotte defeated Brie in 1:40, and Paige and Banks wrestled to a time limit draw, giving Charlotte the win and the title shot. On the September 7 episode of Raw, Charlotte was awarded a title match against Nikki the following week. During the match Nikki switched places with Brie, so Charlotte pinned Brie instead. Stephanie McMahon decided that Charlotte could not win the title by pinning Brie Bella but scheduled a rematch for Night of Champions with the stipulation that should Nikki be disqualified or counted out, she would lose the title. With this win, Nikki Bella became WWE Divas Champion at 294 days.

At SummerSlam, Neville and Stephen Amell defeated Stardust and King Barrett. On the September 3 edition of SmackDown, Neville was scheduled to face Stardust, but The Ascension attacked Neville and allied with Stardust, preventing the match from occurring. On the September 17 episode of Raw, Neville allied with The Lucha Dragons and the trio attacked Stardust and The Ascension. A match pitting Neville and The Lucha Dragons against Stardust and The Ascension was then scheduled for the Night of Champions Kickoff pre-show.

Event

Pre-show
During the Night of Champions Kickoff pre-show, Neville and The Lucha Dragons (Kalisto and Sin Cara) faced Stardust and The Ascension. The match ended when Stardust pushed Viktor, causing Neville to fall off the top rope. Stardust pinned Neville after a Queen's Crossbow to win the match.

Preliminary matches
The actual pay-per-view opened with Ryback defending the Intercontinental Championship against Kevin Owens. The end came when Ryback attempted Shell Shocked but Owens raked Ryback's eyes and pinned Ryback with a roll-up to win the title.

Next, Dolph Ziggler faced Rusev (with Summer Rae). The match ended when Summer Rae threw her shoe at the referee but the shoe hit Rusev instead, allowing Ziggler to pin Rusev after a Zig Zag.

After that, The New Day (Big E and Kofi Kingston) defended their WWE Tag Team Championship against The Dudley Boyz (Bubba Ray Dudley and D-Von Dudley). After Bubba Ray and D-Von had executed a 3D on Kingston, Bubba Ray attempted a pinfall, which was broken up by Xavier Woods. Accordingly, The New Day were disqualified, but retained the titles. After the match, The Dudley Boyz put Woods through a table with a 3D.

In the fourth match, Nikki Bella defended her Divas Championship against Charlotte, which Nikki would lose the title if she was counted out or disqualified per the stipulations. The match ended when Nikki dove off the second rope but Charlotte executed a Spear in mid-air on Nikki and forced her to submit to the Figure Eight Leglock to win the title.

In the fifth match, The Wyatt Family (Bray Wyatt, Luke Harper, and Braun Strowman) faced Roman Reigns, Dean Ambrose and their mystery partner, who was revealed to be Chris Jericho. In the climax, Reigns went for a Spear on Strowman but Jericho tagged himself in and performed a Lionsault on Strowman for a near-fall. Jericho attempted a Codebreaker but Strowman countered, executed a Yokosuka Cutter and then applied a Lifting Arm Triangle Choke on Jericho. Jericho passed out, giving The Wyatt Family the win by technical submission.

In the penultimate match, Seth Rollins defended the United States Championship against John Cena. In the end, Rollins attempted an Attitude Adjustment on Cena but Cena countered with an Inverted Suplex on Rollins, which he followed with a Diving Leg Drop Bulldog. Cena executed an Attitude Adjustment on Rollins to win the title. After the match, Rollins, who had a scheduled WWE World Heavyweight Championship defense next, retrieved his title belt and tried to walk backstage, but was stopped by Cena, who executed another Attitude Adjustment on Rollins.

Main event
In the main event, Seth Rollins defended the WWE World Heavyweight Championship against Sting. During the match, Sting pulled Rollins onto a broadcast table but Rollins pushed Sting, knocking him through another broadcast table. Sting performed a Scorpion Death Drop on Rollins but Rollins placed his foot on the bottom rope, voiding the pinfall. Rollins performed a Turnbuckle Powerbomb on Sting, who suffered a legitimate neck injury. Rollins attempted a Pedigree on Sting, who countered into a Scorpion Deathlock, but Rollins touched the ropes, forcing Sting to break the hold. The match ended when Rollins attempted a Pedigree but Sting countered and attempted a Scorpion Deathlock, which Rollins countered with a small package on Sting to retain the title.

While Rollins was celebrating, Sheamus appeared to cash in his Money in the Bank contract.  Rollins attempted to attack Sheamus with the WWE World Heavyweight Championship but Sheamus avoided and executed a Brogue Kick on Rollins. Before Sheamus could cash in, Kane appeared and performed Chokeslams on Rollins and Sheamus. Kane then executed a Tombstone Piledriver on Rollins and stood over him as the event ended.

Aftermath 
Following the event, WWE confirmed that Sting sustained an injury during his match with Rollins. Sting injured his neck when he received a powerbomb onto a turnbuckle. The title match with Rollins would be Sting's final match in WWE, as on April 2, 2016, during his WWE Hall of Fame induction speech, Sting announced his retirement. However, after five years and after his legends contract with WWE expired, Sting debuted in rival promotion All Elite Wrestling (AEW) in December 2020 at Winter Is Coming; he officially came out of retirement, having his first match in over five years at AEW's Revolution pay-per-view on March 7, 2021.

The following night on Raw, "Corporate Kane" returned and resumed his position as Director of Operations, seemingly oblivious to his attack on Rollins at Night of Champions. Following a series of confrontations, Kane received a title match against Rollins at Hell in a Cell, which Rollins won. As a result, Kane lost his position as Director of Operations.

Also on Raw, when Charlotte was celebrating her victory over Nikki Bella at Night of Champions, her teammate Paige went on a rant about how there is no Divas Revolution, telling Charlotte the reason she won the Divas Championship was because of her father Ric Flair and telling Becky Lynch that she is irrelevant in PCB, thus turning heel in the process. A rematch between Charlotte and Nikki for the Divas Championship was later scheduled for Hell in a Cell.

Later in the same show, Randy Orton joined forces with Roman Reigns and Dean Ambrose as he attacked The Wyatt Family. A Hell in a Cell match between Reigns and Bray Wyatt was later scheduled for Hell in a Cell.

Ryback invoked his rematch clause for the Intercontinental Championship against Kevin Owens on the October 1 episode of SmackDown, where Ryback would win by count out, meaning Owens retained the championship. The two had a match at Hell in a Cell, where Owens defeated Ryback via pinfall to retain the title and end the feud.
 
Before Dean Ambrose and Roman Reigns revealed Chris Jericho as their mystery partner, a fan managed to jump the barricade and enter the ring without getting caught by security. WWE would later release a statement on this situation, stating that "WWE takes the safety of our performers very seriously, and any fan entering the ring area will be prosecuted to the fullest extent of the law."

The 2015 Night of Champions was the final Night of Champions event held. It was replaced by the similarly themed Clash of Champions in 2016.

Results

References

External links 

2015
Events in Houston
2015 WWE Network events
2015 in Texas
Professional wrestling in Houston
2015 WWE pay-per-view events
September 2015 events in the United States